Mahmoud Kalboussi (born 9 February 1965 in Akouda) is a retired Tunisian athlete who competed in middle- and long-distance events. He represented his country at the 1988 and 1992 Summer Olympics as well as two World Indoor Championships.

Competition record

Personal bests
Outdoor
1000 meters – 2:18.09 (Grosseto 1990)
1500 meters – 3:35.73 (Nice 1992)
One mile – 3:57.00 (Lausanne 1990) NR
3000 meters – 7:47.92 (Arnsberg 1995) NR
5000 meters – 13:32.84 (Caserta 1992) NR
Indoor
3000 meters – 7:53.75 (Seville 1991)
5000 meters – 13:56.95 (San Sebastián 1995)

References

External links
All-Athletics profile

1965 births
Living people
People from Sousse Governorate
Tunisian male middle-distance runners
Tunisian male long-distance runners
Athletes (track and field) at the 1988 Summer Olympics
Athletes (track and field) at the 1992 Summer Olympics
Olympic athletes of Tunisia
Athletes (track and field) at the 1991 Mediterranean Games
Mediterranean Games competitors for Tunisia
20th-century Tunisian people